Chaz Miracle Allen Robinson (born November 8, 1992) is an indoor American football linebacker who is currently a free agent. He was born in Newport News, Virginia and was raised in Hampton, Virginia. In high school, Robinson decided to play high school football for Phoebus High School in Hampton. Robinson continued his football career playing college football for St. Augustine's University. During his senior season at St. Augustine's, Robinson was named the Co-Defensive Player of the Year in the Central Intercollegiate Athletic Association (CIAA). After graduating in 2014, Robinson signed with the Blacktips of the Fall Experimental Football League (FXFL). Following the fall season, Robinson signed with the York Capitals. In August 2018, he then went on to teach American style football to youth and mature Chinese sports enthusiasts for the Skyway Youth American Football Academy where he coaching and playing simultaneously for a Professional Football Team in Foshan, China called the Foshan Tigers in the CNFL (China National Football League).

Early life
Robinson was born to Nina Robinson on November 8, 1992. Robinson's mother was diagnosed with uterine fibroid tumors while she was pregnant with Chaz. Fortunately, Robinson was born with no side effects of the drugs doctors prescribed to his mother during the pregnancy. Robinson would grow up healthy, and attended Phoebus High School in Hampton, Virginia. While at Phoebus, Robinson helped lead the Phantoms to three state championships as a member of the football team.

College career
After initially drawing interested from several Division I football programs, Robinson was left with just a football scholarship offer from St. Augustine's University.

Professional career
In 2015, Robinson signed with the York Capitals of American Indoor Football.

References

External links
St. Augustine's bio

Living people
American football linebackers
Sportspeople from Newport News, Virginia
St. Augustine's Falcons football players
Central Penn Capitals players
Blacktips (FXFL) players
1992 births
Sportspeople from Hampton, Virginia
Players of American football from Virginia